Daniel S. Levine is an American film producer. He is best known for producing the critically acclaimed film Arrival (2016) that earned him an Academy Award for Best Picture nomination with Shawn Levy, Aaron Ryder, and David Linde.

Filmography 
He was producer for all films unless otherwise noted.

Film

Television

Honors 
 Nominated: Academy Award for Best Picture -  Arrival 
 Nominated: BAFTA Award for Best Film -  Arrival
 Nominated: Producers Guild of America Award for Best Theatrical Motion Picture -  Arrival

References

External links
 

Living people
Film producers from Texas
People from Dallas
Year of birth missing (living people)